List of Germany national rugby union players is a list of people who have played for the Germany national rugby union team. The list only includes players who have played in a Test match.

Note that the "position" column lists the position at which the player made his Test debut, not necessarily the position for which he is best known. A position in parentheses indicates that the player debuted as a substitute.

Unofficial: Pre-1927
At the 1900 Summer Olympics, Germany was represented by SC 1880 Frankfurt, with the following players being called up:

Official: From 1927 onwards
The official German rugby union team's international history begun on 17 April 1927, when it played France in Paris and lost 5-30. The following players were called up for Germany since:

Notes

  Scrum.com, the main source for this list, lists Germany games from the Moldova game in November 2006 onwards and ignores all debuts made before that date. Players not individually referenced may have had their debuts before November 2006.

References

External links
 Deutscher Rugby-Verband - Official Site
 TotalRugby.de German rugby website with news and results
 Germany at RugbyData.com Statistics and results
 Rugby International News - Germany

Rugby union players
 
Germany